Charles Randolph-Wright is an American film, television, and theatre director, television producer, screenwriter, and playwright.

Early life
A native of York, South Carolina, Randolph-Wright graduated with honors from York High School. He attended Duke University where he was a recipient of the prestigious A.B. Duke Scholarship and a pre-med student. As an undergraduate, he studied acting with the Royal Shakespeare Company in London and danced with the Alvin Ailey School in New York City. Randolph-Wright graduated with honors from Duke University with a B.A. degree in theater and religion.

Career

Theater
Randolph-Wright's earliest Broadway credit was as a member of the original cast of the musical Dreamgirls. He then went on to establish a distinguished career in the theater as a director.

Randolph-Wright directed Motown: The Musical with a book by Berry Gordy, founder of Motown Records, based on Gordy's autobiography To Be Loved: The Music, the Magic, the Memories of Motown (1994). It premiered on Broadway at the Lunt-Fontaine Theatre on April 14, 2013. A national tour launched in Chicago in April 2014. A West End production opened at the Shaftesbury Theatre on February 11, 2016. A UK and Ireland tour began on October 11, 2018, at The Alexandra, Birmingham.

Randolph-Wright directed Born For This: A New Musical which he co-wrote with Grammy Award winning gospel artist BeBe Winans and Lisa D'Amour. It premiered at the Alliance Theatre in Atlanta in a co-production with Arena Stage in Washington, D.C. in 2016. Subsequent productions were produced at The Broad Stage in Santa Monica, CA and ArtsEmerson in Boston.

Other notable credits include a revival of the musical revue Sophisticated Ladies at Arena Stage starring Maurice Hines, which enjoyed a record breaking run at the historic Lincoln Theatre in 2010 and Daniel Beaty's Through The Night, which opened Off-Broadway at the Union Square Theatre produced by Daryl Roth in the fall of 2010. He also staged a national tour of George and Ira Gershwin's Porgy and Bess that launched in 2010 in celebration of the opera's 75th anniversary.

Randolph-Wright also directed two acclaimed productions for Arena Stage of musicals written by Frank Loesser. His revival of Guys and Dolls, which also starred Hines, was selected by the Loesser estate to tour in celebration of the musical's 50th anniversary. Randolph-Wright also directed Señor Discretion Himself, the last musical written by Mr. Loesser before his death in 1969, which was based on a story by Budd Schulberg and co-written with Culture Clash. The production earned a 2005 Helen Hayes Award for Outstanding Regional Musical.

Randolph-Wright's directing credits also include Lynn Nottage's Pulitzer Prize winning play Ruined at Arena Stage, Brian Stokes Mitchell's acclaimed solo show Love/Life at Lincoln Center Theater, They're Playing Our Song (in Portuguese) in Rio de Janeiro and São Paulo, Brasil, Daniel Beaty's Emergency at the Geffen Playhouse, Althol Fugard's Blood Knot, featuring music by Tracy Chapman, at the American Conservatory Theater in San Francisco, the premiere of Cheryl L. West's stage adaptation of the film, Akeelah and the Bee, for the Children's Theatre Company in Minneapolis and Arena Stage, and the world premiere of Oni Faida Lampley's Tough Titty at the Williamstown Theatre Festival. Charles also directed and co-wrote Me and Mrs. Jones, a musical which starred Lou Rawls and featured the classic R&B music of the Sound of Philadelphia at the Prince Music Theatre, The Diva Is Dismissed, starring Jenifer Lewis at the Public Theater and the Hudson Theatre in Los Angeles, Homework starring Kim Coles, Just Between Friends starring Bea Arthur, which toured internationally and was mounted in a Tony nominated run on Broadway, and the Broadway premiere of Alice Childress's Trouble in Mind at Roundabout Theatre Company's American Airlines Theatre in 2021. 

Randolph-Wright will direct the world premiere of the musical American Prophet: Frederick Douglass in His Own Words, which he co-wrote with Grammy winner Marcus Hummon at Arena Stage starring Cornelius Smith, Jr. He is also slated to direct the premiere of Nmon Ford's Orfeus: A House Music Opera at the Young Vic in London.

Randolph-Wright's playwriting credits include Blue, which premiered at Arena Stage in April 2000. With music by Nona Hendryx and direction by Sheldon Epps, it starred Phylicia Rashad, Hill Harper, and Michael McElroy. The Roundabout Theatre Company produced the New York premiere of the play in the summer of 2001. The play received a subsequent production at Pasadena Playhouse starring Ms. Rashad, Diahann Carroll, and Clifton Davis in September 2002. In January 2020, it was announced that Ms. Rashad will direct a revival at the Apollo Theatre starring Leslie Uggams and Lynn Whitfield.

Randolph-Wright also wrote and directed the premiere of Cuttin' Up at Arena Stage in the fall of 2005. Adapted from Craig Marberry's best selling book "Cuttin' Up: Wit and Wisdom from Black Barber Shops," subsequent productions of the play were produced at Pasadena Playhouse, Cleveland Play House, and the Alliance Theatre. His play, The Night Is A Child, premiered at the Milwaukee Repertory Theater in March 2008 under the direction of Timothy Douglas. The play received its West Coast premiere in September 2009 in a production at Pasadena Playhouse directed by Sheldon Epps and starring Jobeth Williams. His play, Love in Afghanistan, premiered at Arena Stage in October 2013 with direction by Lucie Tiberghien.

Television
Randolph-Wright is directing and serves as executive producer with Oprah Winfrey for the series Delilah. Created by Craig Wright and produced by Warner Bros. Television and Harpo Films, Delilah will air on the Oprah Winfrey Network (OWN) in 2021. Maahra Hill stars in the title role. The cast also includes Jill Marie Jones, Susan Heyward, and Ozioma Akagha. Randolph-Wright has directed episodes of the series Greenleaf on OWN, Katy Keene on The CW, Step Up: Highwater on YouTube Red, Lincoln Heights on ABC Family, and South of Nowhere on The N. Randolph-Wright was also the producer and writer of the Showtime series Linc's and a writer/consultant on the Fox series "Lush Life". He has also directed many commercials, including the European "Freestyle" campaign for Nike, which won several international commercial awards, and music videos. His musical staging has been seen on a variety of programs, including The Golden Girls. His acting credits include guest appearances on Melrose Place, Falcon Crest and Hill Street Blues.

Film
Randolph-Wright made his directorial film debut with Preaching to the Choir, originally titled On the One, which earned the Best Performance by an Actor, Audience Award for Best Narrative Feature, and Grand Jury Prize for Best Picture at the 2005 American Black Film Festival (ABFF). He is executive producer with Debbie Allen of the film Maurice Hines: Bring Them Back, which won the 2019 DOC NYC Grand Jury Prize and the 2020 Jury Award for Best Documentary at ABFF. He has also developed screenplays for Showtime, HBO, Walt Disney Pictures, Victory Entertainment, Producers Entertainment Group, Tim Reid Productions, and 20th Century Fox. He also co-wrote the screenplay White Chocolate with John Leguizamo. Randolph-Wright was the co-producer of the Angela Davis Story for Castle Rock Entertainment, and developed the short film Family Tree (Disney).

Honors and awards 
Randolph-Wright received the 2010 Paul Robeson Award from Actors' Equity Association. The annual award honors individuals for their exemplary artistic and humanitarian achievements. Past recipients include Ossie Davis, Ruby Dee, Lloyd Richards, and Sidney Poitier. In the summer of 2010, Randolph-Wright received a three-year playwright residency as part of Arena Stage's American Voices New Play Institute, which began in January 2011. He was awarded Duke University's Distinguished Alumni Award in 2017. The annual award honors alumni who have made outstanding contributions through their field of work, in service to the university and toward the betterment of humanity.

Randolph-Wright serves on the board of directors of the Roundabout Theatre Company, the Advisory Committee of the American Theatre Wing, and is an Artistic Associate at the Young Vic. He also serves on the board of directors of the Frederick Douglass Family Initiatives, a non-profit organization founded by direct descendants of Frederick Douglass and Booker T. Washington focused on the struggle for racial equity and an end to human exploitation.

References

External links
Official site

 

Living people
People from York, South Carolina
African-American film directors
African-American screenwriters
African-American television directors
American theatre directors
American television directors
American television producers
Angier B. Duke Scholars
Duke University alumni
Film directors from South Carolina
Screenwriters from South Carolina
Year of birth missing (living people)
21st-century African-American people